Events from the year 1600 in the Kingdom of Scotland

Incumbents

Monarch – James VI

Events
 1 January – today is adopted as New Year's Day following the partial adoption of the Gregorian Calendar in Scotland
 20 March – Construction of Cullen House in Moray begins.
 5 August – the Gowrie House affair, a plot to kidnap James VI in Perth, in which Robert Logan of Restalrig is implicated, devised by John Ruthven, 3rd Earl of Gowrie (who dies in the attempt, together with his brother Alexander Ruthven)
 19 November – the future King Charles I of England and Scotland, son of James VI, is born in Dunfermline Palace
 Scalloway Castle is built on Mainland, Shetland, by Patrick Stewart, 2nd Earl of Orkney

Births
 19 November – Charles I, king of England and Scotland (executed 1649 in England)
 November – John Ogilby, cartographer (died 1676 in England)
 Approximate date
 David Leslie, Lord Newark, soldier (died 1682)
 Samuel Rutherford, theologian (died 1661)

Deaths
 March – Margaret Stuart, royal princess (born 1598)
 5 August – Gowrie House affair
John Ruthven, 3rd Earl of Gowrie, nobleman and kidnapper (born c.1577)
Alexander Ruthven, master of Ruthven (born 1580)
 12 December – John Craig, minister (born c.1512)

See also
 Timeline of Scottish history
 1600 in England
 1600 in Ireland

References